Little Glee Monster (リトル グリー モンスター, Ritoru Gurī Monsutā) is a Japanese girl vocal group, formed in 2013. The group currently consists of Asahi Kobayashi, Mayu Yoshida, Karen Koga, Mika Fujihira, Yumi Nagai, and Kamala Miyu Aida. They were signed to Sony Music Entertainment Japan and released their debut single “Houkago High Five” in 2014. Their fifth album, Flava, is their most successful album, peaking at number one on both Oricon and [[Billboard Japan|Japan's Billboard]] charts, and certified Gold by the Recording Industry Association of Japan for sales of 100,000. In 2018, they won an award at the 2018 MTV Europe Music Awards for Best Japanese Act. In July 2022, following the extended absence and ultimate resignation of two original members for health reasons, Watanabe Entertainment and Sony Music jointly established the "Monster Groove Lab" to audition new members. From the audition process, three new singers joined in November 2022.

Members 
Current members
Asahi Kobayashi (小林あさひ) (2013–present)
Mayu Yoshida (吉田真悠) (2013–present)
Karen Koga (古賀かれん) (2013–present)
Mika Fujihira (藤平美香) (2022–present)
Yumi Nagai (永井結海) (2022–present)
Kamala Miyu Aida (カマラみゆアイダ) (2022–present)

Former members
Lina Yoshimura (吉村リナ) (2013)
Yuka Sakamoto (坂本有香) (2013)
Maju Arai (荒井麻珠) (2013-2017)
Manaka Fukumoto (福本まなか) (2013-2022)
Serina Hasegawa (長谷川芹奈) (2013-2022)

Discography
Studio albums

Extended plays

Singles

Other songs
"Gao Gao Orusutā" (Ending song from Pokémon'': XY)
"Colorful" (collaboration song for Coca Cola and the Olympics)

Awards and nominations

References

External links
 
 
 

Japanese girl groups
Vocal quintets
Musical groups established in 2013
2013 establishments in Japan
Sony Music Entertainment Japan artists